Luo Yadong (born 15 January 1992) is a Chinese racewalking athlete. Representing China at the 2019 World Athletics Championships, he placed fifth in the men's 50 kilometres walk.

References

External links
 

Chinese male racewalkers
1992 births
Living people
World Athletics Championships athletes for China
Athletes (track and field) at the 2020 Summer Olympics
Olympic athletes of China